Broadford Secondary College is a public, co-ed, secondary school located in the village of Broadford which is located in the Mitchell Shire.

About the school
Broadford Secondary College offers a range of options to students to complete their senior school. They can choose a broad program that leaves a range of options open. Students in Years 11 and 12 can elect to complete the Victorian Certificate of Applied Learning (VCAL) or Victorian Certificate of Education (VCE).

History
The school was founded as Broadford High School, then changed its name to Broadford Secondary College.

Sport
The Mitchell Rangers Soccer Club plays its home games at Broadford Secondary College.

References

External links
School Website

Public high schools in Victoria (Australia)